Allan Shiach, who writes and produces under the pseudonym Allan Scott, is a Scottish screenwriter and producer, and former Scotch whisky executive. He was nominated for BAFTA's Alexander Korda Award for Best British Film and two Genie Awards for his 1997 film Regeneration. He has won the Edgar Award (1976) and Writers' Guild Award (1978). He was executive producer and co-creator of the multi-award-winning Netflix series The Queen's Gambit.

Biography

Early life
Allan Scott was born in Elgin, Moray, son of Leslie (a lawyer) and Lucie Shiach. His father died in a car accident when Scott was 8. Educated at Gordonstoun School and McGill University, Montreal, where he obtained a BA(Hons) in English Literature. After training in the Scotch whisky industry, he worked as a writer for television both in the UK and the US during the 1970s whilst at the same time as serving as a non-executive director of Macallan-Glenlivet plc.

Career
He was chairman and chief executive of Macallan-Glenlivet from 1979 until the company was sold in 1997, and during this 18-year period the company's reputation for innovative and focused marketing and management had helped it to establish a highly successful, international brand of single malt whisky and increased its stock market value more six hundredfold. The company won the Queen's Award for Export on three occasions.

He served for several years on the Broadcasting Council of BBC Scotland and in 1986 succeeded Sir Denis Forman as Chairman of the Scottish Film Production Fund. His subsequent Chairmanship of the Scottish Film Council lasted for six years and following upon that body's initiative to create a new, broadly-based organisation for the Scottish screen industries, comprising the Film Archive, Media Education, Exhibition, Screen Locations and Production Fund; he was appointed Chairman of the new organisation named Scottish Screen. Having chaired the Interim Board which supervised the transition and consolidation, he remained as chairman for a further year before stepping down in 1998, after twelve years of involvement with Scotland's filmmaking bodies.

While continuing his career as a screenwriter and producer, he was also a director of both Caledonian Newspapers and Scottish Television plc, and when the companies merged to form SMG plc he remained on the board for thirteen years. He was appointed a governor of the British Film Institute in 1992 and served that board for some six years. He is also a former chairman of the Writers' Guild of Great Britain, thus perhaps the only person ever to chair a trades union and a Stock Exchange company at the same time.

He was executive producer of the thriller Shallow Grave (1994). He also wrote and produced the BAFTA-nominated film Regeneration (1997), as well as The Fourth Angel (2001). He has written or co-written more than a dozen films, including The Awakening (with Chris Bryant, 1980) and five films directed by Nicolas Roeg: Don't Look Now (with Chris Bryant, 1973), Castaway (1986), The Witches (1990), Cold Heaven (1991) and Two Deaths (1995). He was also co-writer of The Preacher's Wife (1996) and In Love and War (1996). Scott was co-writer and script consultant on the Norwegian film Kon-Tiki (2012), which was nominated for an Oscar in 2013 in the foreign language category.

He is the originator, co-producer and co-writer of the stage musical adaptation of the 1990s film The Adventures of Priscilla, Queen of the Desert, which opened in Sydney in October 2006 and has since become the most successful Australian stage musical of all time. Productions in over 30 cities have grossed a nearly $US500 million. The London production of the show ran for three years before it was launched in North America, beginning in Toronto prior to Broadway, where it was nominated for two Tony Awards. Other productions are being presented regularly in major centres around the world. It is the winner of 5 Australian Green Room Awards, an Olivier Award and the What's On Stage Award for Best New Musical, a Tony Award in the US, and in Canada 6 Broadway World awards and the Toronto Theatre Critics Award. In Italy it has won 4 DAPA Awards and in Argentina 7 awards. It has also won 12 Hugo Awards including Best Musical and 10 awards in Spain. In France it won a Best Musical Cristal Award.

He was executive producer and co-creator of the Netflix series The Queen's Gambit, adapted from the Walter Tevis novel of the same name, which Scott acquired the rights for in 1992, and directed by Scott Frank.

He is currently preparing a production of The Conjuror (co-written with David Ambrose), to be directed by Des McAnuff, as well as The Garden of the Black Martini (co-written with Allison Burnett), and two new musicals.

He has been awarded honorary doctorates by Napier University, Edinburgh (2007) and by Aberdeen University (2008), and is Visiting Professor of Film at Edinburgh Napier.

Personal life
Scott married actress Kathleen Breck on 12 November 1966 and they have 3 children: Dominic, Philippa and Luke.

References

External links

Living people
People from Moray
McGill University alumni
Scottish chief executives
Scottish screenwriters
Scottish film producers
People educated at Gordonstoun
1939 births